David Patrick Cadigan (born April 6, 1965) is a former American football offensive lineman in the National Football League.

Early years
Cadigan was born in Needham, Massachusetts.  He prepped at Newport Harbor High School in Newport Beach, California.

College career
Cadigan was drafted in 1988 in the first round with the eighth overall pick from the University of Southern California.

Professional career
Cadigan played for the New York Jets between 1988 and 1993 and for the Cincinnati Bengals in 1994.

External links
New York Jets bio

1965 births
Living people
All-American college football players
American football offensive guards
American football offensive tackles
Cincinnati Bengals players
New York Jets players
Sportspeople from Newport Beach, California
Sportspeople from Needham, Massachusetts
Players of American football from California
USC Trojans football players
Newport Harbor High School alumni